Charles Emmett Yeater (April 24, 1861 – July 20, 1943) of Sedalia, Missouri was acting Governor-General of the Philippines from March 5, 1921 to October 14, 1921.

From 1901 to 1935, the governor-general was the chief political executive of the Philippines, when the country was governed by the United States of America.

The Charles E. Yeater Learning Center at State Fair Community College in Sedalia is named for him.

He served as Democratic member of the Missouri Senate in 1892, and was a supporter of the legislation to move the Missouri State Capital from Jefferson City to Sedalia, which failed in the popular vote.

He is buried at Crown Hill Cemetery, Sedalia, Missouri.

References

1861 births
1943 deaths
People from Sedalia, Missouri
Democratic Party Missouri state senators
Governors-General of the Philippine Islands
American expatriates in the Philippines
History of the Philippines (1898–1946)